The Palatka Azaleas were a minor league baseball team, based in Palatka, Florida, that existed from 1936 to 1939 and from 1946 to 1953. The Azaleas were members of the Florida State League. In 1936, they were affiliated with the Detroit Tigers, in 1937 they were affiliated with the New York Yankees, and in 1949 they were affiliated with the Tampa Smokers. In 1956, a Palatka team began play again and evolved into the Palatka Redlegs.

The Ballpark

Palatka teams played at the Azalea Bowl in Forrester Field, which is listed on the National Register of Historic Places. The address is 1600 Twigg Street. The park, with the original grandstand demolished, is still in use today as home to the Palatka High School Panthers. Babe Ruth conducted clinics at the field in the late 1930s."

Notable alumni
Myril Hoag (1946) MLB All-Star
Bernie Neis (1936)
 Bob Swift (1936-1937)
 Sam Zoldak (1938)

Year-by-year record

References

Defunct Florida State League teams
Baseball teams established in 1936
Baseball teams disestablished in 1953
Detroit Tigers minor league affiliates
New York Yankees minor league affiliates
Defunct baseball teams in Florida
1936 establishments in Florida
1953 disestablishments in Florida
Palatka, Florida